Filthy Preppy Teens (stylized as Filthy Preppy Teen$) is an American satirical teen sitcom developed for Fullscreen by Paul Scheer, Curtis Gwinn and Jonathan Stern. The series, in which two wealthy teen siblings try to re-climb the social ladder after being presumed lost at sea, parodies teen dramas such as Pretty Little Liars and Gossip Girl. It debuted on April 26, 2016, as part of the first slate of programming on multi-channel network Fullscreen's eponymous subscription video-on-demand platform as a half-hour format program with an eight-episode order.

The original pilot, Filthy Sexy Teens, aired as a quarter-hour format television special on Adult Swim on October 11, 2013. On April 27, 2015, the project was picked up to series as part of Abominable Pictures' first-look development deal with Fox, with Keith Quinn and Jonathan Stern as executive producers alongside Paul Scheer and Curtis Gwinn.

Cast
This includes the cast members of both the original pilot and the show series.

 A dark grey cell indicates the character was not featured.

Episodes

References

External links
 Filthy Preppy Teens at Abominable Pictures
 
 
 Filthy Sexy Teens at Adult Swim

2010s American high school television series
2010s American satirical television series
2010s American teen sitcoms
2013 television specials
2016 American television series debuts
2016 American television series endings
Adult Swim pilots and specials
English-language television shows
Mass media portrayals of the upper class
Television series about siblings
Television series about teenagers
Television series by 20th Century Fox Television
Television shows filmed in Los Angeles